In mathematics, the logarithmic mean is a function of two non-negative numbers which is equal to their difference divided by the logarithm of their quotient.  
This calculation is applicable in engineering problems involving heat and mass transfer.

Definition
The logarithmic mean is defined as:

for the positive numbers .

Inequalities 

The logarithmic mean of two numbers is smaller than the arithmetic mean and the generalized mean with exponent one-third but larger than the geometric mean, unless the numbers are the same, in which case all three means are equal to the numbers.

 

Toyesh Prakash Sharma generalizes the arithmetic logarithmic geometric mean inequality for any  belongs to the whole number as

 

Now, for  

 
 

For  

 

for the proof go through the bibliography.

Derivation

Mean value theorem of differential calculus 

From the mean value theorem, there exists a value  in the interval between x and y where the derivative  equals the slope of the secant line:

and solving for :

Integration 

The logarithmic mean can also be interpreted as the area under an exponential curve.
 

The area interpretation allows the easy derivation of some basic properties of the logarithmic mean.

Two other useful integral representations areand

Generalization

Mean value theorem of differential calculus 

One can generalize the mean to  variables by considering the mean value theorem for divided differences for the th derivative of the logarithm.

We obtain

where  denotes a divided difference of the logarithm.

For  this leads to
.

Integral 

The integral interpretation can also be generalized to more variables, but it leads to a different result.

This can be simplified using divided differences of the exponential function to
.

Example 
.

Connection to other means 

 Arithmetic mean: 

 Geometric mean: 

 Harmonic mean:

See also 

 A different mean which is related to logarithms is the geometric mean.
 The logarithmic mean is a special case of the Stolarsky mean.
 Logarithmic mean temperature difference
 Log semiring

References 
Citations

Bibliography
Oilfield Glossary: Term 'logarithmic mean'
 
 Stolarsky, Kenneth B.:  Generalizations of the logarithmic mean, Mathematics Magazine, Vol. 48, No. 2, Mar., 1975, pp 87–92
 Toyesh Prakash Sharma.: https://www.parabola.unsw.edu.au/files/articles/2020-2029/volume-58-2022/issue-2/vol58_no2_3.pdf "A generalisation of the Arithmetic-Logarithmic-Geometric Mean Inequality, Parabola Magazine, Vol. 58, No. 2, 2022, pp 1–5

Mean
Means